Kirsten Renee Storms is an American actress. She is best known for her roles as Zenon Kar in the Zenon trilogy, Emily in Johnny Tsunami, and Bonnie Rockwaller in Kim Possible. Storms played Isabella "Belle" Black on the NBC soap opera Days of Our Lives from 1999 to 2004. In 2005, Storms was cast as the character Maxie Jones on the ABC soap opera General Hospital and its spin-off General Hospital: Night Shift.

Early life and career
Storms was born in Orlando, Florida and grew up in the Greater Orlando area, mainly Kissimmee, Casselberry and Sanford. She has a younger sister named Gretchen, a brother named Austin and a half-brother named Chris. She is the daughter of Karen Storms and CBS affiliate WCPX-TV (now WKMG-TV) sportscaster Mike Storms. According to Storms, she always knew she wanted to be a soap opera actress. At age five she announced:

After visiting her father at work, Storms convinced her parents to enroll her in acting classes, leading to her discovery by a talent scout at the age of five. The talent scout suggested she be enrolled in an intensive children's acting camp in the Catskills, New York.

Storms' first role was a commercial for Galoob Baby Doll. After appearing in a handful of other commercials, her television career included a recurring role on ABC's Second Noah, plus a lead role in Sing Me a Story with Belle. At age twelve, she moved with her family to Los Angeles, California. Soon after that, she landed the recurring role of Laura Cummings on The WB's long-running program 7th Heaven. She appeared in three episodes between 1998 and 2001, in which she played a girlfriend of Simon (played by David Gallagher). She was later chosen to play the title character in Disney Channel's original movie Zenon: Girl of the 21st Century. The movie had the largest rating for any Disney Channel original movie at the time. She later reprised the role in two more sequels. Storms continued to appear in a string of family shows and television movies, including The Trojan Horse, a Hallmark production. She also took a supporting role in Disney's Johnny Tsunami and voiced Bonnie Rockwaller in the Disney Channel animated series Kim Possible.

Television

Days of Our Lives

On August 5, 1999, Storms signed on to play Isabella "Belle" Black on the NBC daytime drama Days of Our Lives. Although she initially faced upset viewers at the sudden SORAS aging her casting brought to the character, Storms soon was popular with the audience. Her five years on the soap opera would feature her in many high-profile storylines, such as the popular relationship with Shawn Brady, played by Jason Cook, as Storms' character was promoted heavily as a major character within the show.

At the end of her five-year contract, Storms opted to not renew her contract with the series, one reason being her pilot had been picked up for the primetime show Clubhouse. Her final episode aired on July 16, 2004.

Clubhouse
Clubhouse was a primetime television series that aired on CBS starting the fall of 2004, created by Daniel Cerone and produced by Aaron Spelling. The series revolved around Pete Young (Jeremy Sumpter) and his dream of becoming a professional baseball player. Storms played Pete's sister, Betsy. Unlike the innocent character of Belle that Kirsten had just left, Betsy was a rebellious teenager often finding herself in trouble over such issues as sex, drugs, and alcohol. Storms embraced the new role, stating, "I can relate to a lot of things Betsy does. I've sat and talked with the executive producer about my first tattoo and the first time I ever had a drink of alcohol, things that she's going to be experiencing too." The show was canceled after only five episodes aired. A total of 11 episodes were shot and later aired on Trio as part of its Brilliant But Cancelled series.

General Hospital
Storms returned to familiar territory on May 23, 2005, becoming the third actress to portray Mariah Maximiliana "Maxie" Jones on the ABC soap opera General Hospital. In 2008, Storms was reunited with Jason Cook, who joined the soap as Matt Hunter. She received an Emmy nomination for her role in 2009.

Storms vacated the role in fall 2011 due to medical reasons, later revealed to be endometriosis. She was temporarily replaced with Jen Lilley, and originally scheduled to return to work in February 2012. Her illness prevented her from returning on time, and Lilley was kept on for the foreseeable future. In July 2012, it was announced that Storms would return to the series. On September 5, 2012, Storms reprised the role of Maxie on-screen. Storms took maternity leave on January 2, 2014, and returned on April 8 of the same year.
In March 2017, Soap Opera Spy reported that Storms was leaving the show for "personal reasons,". She returned to General Hospital in August 2017.

Other work
In 2015, Storms appeared as Selene Winterthorne in the soap opera web series Winterthorne.

Personal life
It was confirmed in early 2013 that Storms was in a relationship with her former General Hospital co-star Brandon Barash. In August 2013, the couple confirmed to People that they had secretly wed in June, and were expecting their first child, a girl, in January 2014. On January 7, 2014, Barash confirmed on his official Twitter account that Storms had given birth to a baby girl, Harper Rose Barash. On April 6, 2016, Soap Opera Digest revealed that Storms and Barash had filed for divorce after more than two-and-a-half years of marriage, citing irreconcilable differences, but they will raise their daughter together as they are splitting amicably.

Storms was pulled over on a Los Angeles freeway on September 7, 2007, by California Highway Patrol for tossing a lit cigarette out of the window of her Mercedes. She was arrested for a DUI following her failure at sobriety tests. Her blood alcohol content was measured at 0.13, above the California legal limit of 0.08. In November 2007, she pleaded no contest to the charges and was ordered to attend twelve Alcoholics Anonymous meetings, complete a 90-day alcohol education program, and pay $1,643 in fines. She also had her license suspended for six months and was placed on three years' probation.

Storms is close friends with General Hospital co-star Kelly Monaco, which was featured in the short-lived E! reality show Dirty Soap, which aired during the fall of 2011.

Filmography

Awards and nominations

References

External links
 
 Kirsten Storms on Twitter
 Kirsten Storms on Instagram
 Kirsten Storms on Facebook

American child actresses
American soap opera actresses
American television actresses
American film actresses
American voice actresses
Baptists from Florida
Living people
Actresses from Orlando, Florida
20th-century American actresses
21st-century American actresses
American expatriate actresses in the United Kingdom
Year of birth missing (living people)